Jörg Schlaich (17 October 1934 – 4 September 2021) was a German structural engineer and is known internationally for his ground-breaking work in the creative design of bridges, long-span roofs, and other complex structures. He was a co-founder of the structural engineering and consulting firm Schlaich Bergermann Partner.

He was the brother of the architect Brigitte Schlaich Peterhans.

Early career
Jörg Schlaich studied architecture and civil engineering from 1953 to 1955 at Stuttgart University before completing his studies at the Technical University of Berlin in 1959. He spent 1959 and 1960 at the Case Western Reserve University in Cleveland, United States.

In 1963, he joined the firm Leonhardt & Andrä, the firm founded by Fritz Leonhardt.

Later career
Schlaich was made a partner and was responsible for the Alster-Schwimmhalle in Hamburg, and more importantly, the Olympic Stadium in Munich. He stayed with the firm until 1969.

In 1974 he became an academic at Stuttgart University, and in 1980 he founded his own firm, Schlaich Bergermann Partner.

In 1993, with the roof of the Gottlieb-Daimler-Stadion (since 2008 Mercedes-Benz-Arena) in Stuttgart, he introduced the "speichenrad" principle to structural engineering. Indeed, this principle was employed for the first time in the history of Structural Engineering by the Italian engineer Massimo Majowiecki, the designer of the roof of the Olympic Stadium, Rome (built in 1990, three years before the Gottlieb-Daimler-Stadion). Since then, his company has successfully employed it in stadium projects across the globe. Other structures include the observation tower at the Killesbergpark in Stuttgart. Most of his work as well of that of his company is documented on their website. He was also the developer of the solar tower (or solar chimney) and is largely credited with inventing the strut and tie model for reinforced concrete.

Further reading
 Schlaich, Jörg; Bergermann, Rudolf. Leicht Weit (Light Structures) .
 Holgate, Alan. The Art of Structural Engineering: The Work of Jorg Schlaich and his Team (Books Britain, 1996) .
 Schlaich, Jörg. The Solar Chimney: Electricity from the Sun .
 Schlaich, Jörg; Rudolf Bergermann, Wolfgang Schiel & Gerhard Weinrebe (February 2005). " ". Journal of Solar Energy Engineering 127 (1): 117-124. DOI:10.1115/1.1823493. Retrieved on 2007-03-15.

External links
 schlaich bergermann partner (sbp) site

References

1934 births
2021 deaths
People from Rems-Murr-Kreis
People from the Free People's State of Württemberg
Bridge engineers
German civil engineers
Structural engineers
Tensile architecture
Tensile membrane structures
Members of the Academy of Arts, Berlin
IStructE Gold Medal winners
Werner von Siemens Ring laureates